Thereus pedusa is a species of butterfly of the family Lycaenidae. It is found from Nicaragua to Brazil (Amazon region) and Suriname.

References

Butterflies described in 1779
Thereus
Taxa named by Pieter Cramer